Natural Born Chaos is the fourth studio album by Swedish melodic death metal band Soilwork. According to Nielsen Soundscan, the album sold 2.267 copies in the US as of 2002.

The album comes in a limited vinyl version and features two lps with this album and Figure Number Five in white and the other black.  The album was voted the number one album by BW and BK magazine in 2002.  A video was also made for "As We Speak".

This is the first album with current keyboardist Sven Karlsson.

This is also the first release from the band to include  elements, such as alternative metal, a style that would become more evident in the band's following release, Figure Number Five.

Track listing

Personnel

Soilwork
 Björn "Speed" Strid − vocals
 Peter Wichers − guitar
 Ola Frenning − guitar
 Ola Flink − bass
 Sven Karlsson − keyboards
 Henry Ranta − drums

Guests
 Mattias Eklundh − guitar solo on "No More Angels"
 Devin Townsend − co-vocals on "Black Star Deceiver" and "Soilworker's Song of the Damned"

References

Soilwork albums
Nuclear Blast albums
2002 albums
Albums produced by Devin Townsend
Albums with cover art by Travis Smith (artist)